Norsk krigsleksikon 1940–1945 is a Norwegian encyclopaedia covering the Second World War.

It was issued in 1995 by the publishing house J.W. Cappelen. The editorial staff consisted of five editors: Hans Fredrik Dahl, Guri Hjeltnes, Berit Nøkleby, Nils Johan Ringdal and Øystein Sørensen. It contains around 1,000 articles, of which around 500 are biographies.

References

Norwegian encyclopedias
History books about World War II
J.W. Cappelens Forlag books
1995 non-fiction books
Norway in World War II
20th-century encyclopedias